Peter Crichton Kirkpatrick (24 August 1916 – 6 October 1995) was a British rower. He competed in the men's coxless four event at the 1948 Summer Olympics.

He also represented England and won a bronze medal in the eights at the 1950 British Empire Games in Auckland, New Zealand.

References

1916 births
1995 deaths
British male rowers
Olympic rowers of Great Britain
Rowers at the 1948 Summer Olympics
People from Brentford
Commonwealth Games medallists in rowing
Commonwealth Games bronze medallists for England
Rowers at the 1950 British Empire Games
Medallists at the 1950 British Empire Games